Silje Schei Tveitdal (born 24 April 1974) is a Norwegian environmentalist and politician for the Socialist Left Party. She served as the party secretary from 2009 to 2015.

Biography 

Silje Schei Tveitdal was the leader of Natur og Ungdom in 1997 and 1998. Before being leader she had been deputy leader since 1994. After leaving Natur og Ungdom she studied social economics at the University of Oslo and is advisor for the Socialist Left Party member in Standing Committee on Energy and the Environment in the Norwegian legislature. She was also chairman of Zero Emission Resource Organisation (ZERO) from its start in 2002. In 2009 she succeeded Edle Daasvand as party secretary of the Socialist Left Party.

She is married to Lars Haltbrekken.

References

1974 births
Living people
Norwegian environmentalists
Norwegian women environmentalists
Nature and Youth activists
Socialist Left Party (Norway) politicians